Francis Percy Hodge known as Frank Hodge was an English badminton player. After serving with distinction during the First World War he returned to playing badminton in 1919. A left handed player he was capped 18 times by England between 1919 and 1933. He won three All England titles.

In 1934 he married Molly Kathleen Clara Drake, another member of the Alexandra Palace Badminton Club. He died in 1957.

Medal Record at the All England Badminton Championships

References

English male badminton players
1894 births
1957 deaths